CEIC may refer to:
CEIC, a subsidiary of Caixin providing business information
Central European International Cup, an international football competition held between 1927 and 1960
Chief Executive in Council, a term in Hong Kong law